The Edison is a steampunk themed nightclub located inside the Higgins Building basement in Los Angeles, California. The Edison opened in 2007.  The Higgins Building basement was Los Angeles' first power plant, built by Thomas Higgins. After spending several years derelict and underwater, it was rescued by entrepreneurs Andrew Meieran and Marc Smith, who made a post-industrial steampunk venue for Los Angeles nightclubbers. It is known for having a rooftop aquarium.

References

External links 

Music venues completed in 2007
Nightclubs in Los Angeles County, California
Companies based in Los Angeles
Steampunk
Culture of Los Angeles